MPPA may refer to:
 Massively parallel processor array, a type of integrated circuit 
 Master of Public Policy and Administration, a multidisciplinary academic graduate degree
 MPPA Retail Group, an Indonesian retail company